Steve Lyons is a British writer. He has written several Doctor Who spin-off novels, as well as programme guides for Star Trek, Red Dwarf and Blackadder. His Doctor Who spin-off novels include the New Series Adventure The Stealers of Dreams.

Doctor Who novels

Virgin New Adventures
Conundrum (1994 )
Head Games (1995 )

Virgin Missing Adventures
Time of Your Life (1995 )
Killing Ground (1996 )

Past Doctor Adventures
The Murder Game (1997 )
The Witch Hunters (1998 )
Salvation (1999 )
The Final Sanction (1999 )

Eighth Doctor Adventures
The Space Age (2000 )
The Crooked World (2002 )

New Series Adventures
The Stealers of Dreams (2005 )

Doctor Who comics
Doctor Who Adventures ongoing comic strip (2010)

Doctor Who audio
The Fires of Vulcan (2000)
Colditz (2001)
The Ratings War (2002)Time Works (2006)
Blood of the Daleks (2006)
Son of the Dragon (2007)
Resistance (2009)
The Architects of History (2010)
The Selachian Gambit (2012)
Day of the Cockroach (2012)
House of Cards (2013)
Smoke and Mirrors (2013)

Other
Doctor Who: The Completely Useless Encyclopedia with Chris Howarth (1996 )
Red Dwarf Programme Guide with Chris Howarth (1997 )
The Completely Useless Star Trek Encyclopaedia with Chris Howarth (1997 )
Cunning: The "Blackadder" Programme Guide with Chris Howarth (2002 )
The Legacy Quest: Book 1 (2002 )
The Legacy Quest: Book 2 (2002 )
The Legacy Quest: Book 3 (2002 )
The Power of Fear - a Tomorrow People audio drama by Big Finish Productions (2003)
The Micronauts: The Time Traveller Trilogy Book 1 (2003 )
The Micronauts: The Time Traveller Trilogy Book 2 (2003 )
The Micronauts: The Time Traveller Trilogy Book 3 (2004 )
Sapphire and Steel: The Passenger a Sapphire & Steel audio drama by Big Finish Productions (2005)
Sapphire and Steel: Perfect Day an audio drama by Big Finish Productions (2006)
Sapphire and Steel: Zero an audio drama by Big Finish Productions (2008)
Death World - a Warhammer 40,000 novel (2006 )
Dead Men Walking - a Warhammer 40,000 novel (2010 )
Stargate SG-1: Infiltration an audio drama by Big Finish Productions (2012)
Blake's 7: Jenna's Story an audio drama by Big Finish Productions (2013)
Blake's 7: Velandra an audio drama by Big Finish Productions (2014)
Blake's 7: Devil's Advocate an audio drama by Big Finish Productions (2015)
Vienna: Impossibly Glamorous an audio drama by Big Finish Productions (2016)
Blake's 7: Liberation an audio drama by Big Finish Productions (2017)
Blake's 7: Paradise Lost an audio drama by Big Finish Productions (2017)

References

External links
Interview with Lyons on the BBC Doctor Who website

British science fiction writers
Year of birth missing (living people)
Living people
Place of birth missing (living people)
Writers of Doctor Who novels
20th-century British novelists
21st-century British novelists